James Sibraa (1896–1982) was an Australian rugby league footballer who played in the 1920s.

Playing career
Originally from Rockley, New South Wales, Jim Sibraa joined St. George in the club's second season in 1922 before returning to his home in rural New South Wales.

War service

Jim Sibraa also served in the Australian Army in World War II.

Death
Sibraa died on 27 December 1982 at Dulwich Hill, New South Wales aged 86.

References

1896 births
1982 deaths
St. George Dragons players
Rugby league centres
Australian military personnel of World War II
Rugby league players from New South Wales